Chalair Aviation is a French regional airline with its head office and base on the grounds of Caen – Carpiquet Airport in Carpiquet. It operates scheduled regional services as well as charter flights for various occasions.

History
The airline was founded on October 1986 as Chalair by Philippe Lebaron and renamed to Chalair Aviation in 1997. Starting 1997, besides business and freight flights, Chalair Aviation began operating a Fairchild Swearingen Metroliner for scheduled flights between Le Mans and Eindhoven and an ATR 42 between Cherbourg and Orly. Between 1997 and 2004, Chalair Aviation operated 1 Fairchild Swearingen Metroliner, 1 ATR 42-300 and 3 Cessna Citation II and CJ2 jets.

The airline provides scheduled services as well as corporate shuttle services, freight (including toxic and corrosive material), business and sanitary flights, pilot certification and training, aircraft management and engineering and neighboring islands and JAR Part 145 maintenance services. The airline now employs a total 42 persons, among them 27 are pilots.

In July 2016, Chalair Aviation took over the Antwerp to Hamburg route from bankrupt VLM Airlines, inaugurating its first service to Germany after stopping flights between Lyon and Cologne.

German startup airline brand Green Airlines selected Chalair Aviation as their operating carrier for German domestic services from February 2021.

Destinations

Chalair Aviation operates to the following destinations under their own brand as of July 2019:

France
Agen – Agen La Garenne Airport
Ajaccio – Ajaccio Napoleon Bonaparte Airport (Summer Seasonal)
Bastia – Bastia – Poretta Airport (Summer Seasonal)
Bordeaux – Bordeaux–Mérignac Airport base
Brest – Brest Bretagne Airport
Carpiquet - Caen - Carpiquet Airport base
Limoges – Limoges – Bellegarde Airport 
Lyon – Lyon–Saint Exupéry Airport 
Montpellier – Montpellier–Méditerranée Airport 
Nantes – Nantes Atlantique Airport
Paris – Orly Airport
Pau – Pau Airport
Quimper - Quimper–Cornouaille Airport (UIP)
Rennes – Rennes–Saint-Jacques Airport

Fleet
As of 11 March 2022 the Chalair Aviation consists of the following aircraft:

References

External links

 Official website

Airlines of France
Airlines established in 1986
French companies established in 1986